Anusit Termmee (born 19 January 1995) is a Thai professional footballer who plays as a goalkeeper.

Honours

International
Thailand U-23
 Sea Games  Gold Medal (1); 2017
 Dubai Cup (1) :  2017
Thailand U-21
 Nations Cup (1): 2016

References

1995 births
Living people
Anusit Termmee
Anusit Termmee
Anusit Termmee
Association football goalkeepers
Anusit Termmee
Anusit Termmee
Anusit Termmee
Anusit Termmee
Anusit Termmee
Anusit Termmee
Anusit Termmee
Anusit Termmee
Anusit Termmee
Southeast Asian Games medalists in football
Competitors at the 2017 Southeast Asian Games
Anusit Termmee